The Wild Wild West League is a collegiate summer baseball wooden bat league based out of Portland, Oregon.  It serves as a developmental minor league and is owned and operated by the Portland Pickles collegiate baseball club of the West Coast League.  The league features four teams and all games are played at Charles B. Walker Stadium at Lents Park in southeast Portland, home of the Pickles.

History

2020: Inaugural season
The league was formed by the Portland Pickles in 2020 following the cancellation of the West Coast League's regular season due to the COVID-19 pandemic. Months prior, the Pickles also founded a developmental farm club of their own known as the Portland Gherkins. The Pickles and Gherkins were joined by the previously independent Gresham GreyWolves and West Linn Knights and played the inaugural two-week season at Bob Brack Stadium in Aurora, Oregon, with all players, coaches and staffs having to follow the COVID-19 guidelines at the local, state and federal levels and limited fans in attendance.  The league even grabbed the attention nationally of Forbes magazine.  The article was quoted as saying, "When nobody else could play, the Wild Wild West League thrived." Play officially begin on July 11, 2020, with the Pickles playing the Gherkins.

On July 15, 2020, the league suspended play for at least seven days following positive COVID-19 tests from two players, just four days after the inaugural season started. The league would resume play eight days later.

The Knights won the inaugural league championship defeating the Pickles 8–7 in the championship game.

2021
The league was so successful that it announced a second season and that all of its games would be moved to Walker Stadium at Lents Park in southeast Portland, home of the Pickles, who returned to the WCL. The Knights were folded and both were replaced by the revived Portland Rosebuds (named for the former Negro league team from the 1940's) and Willamette Wild Bills.  The Rosebuds won the 2nd WWWL Championship defeating the Wild Bills 6–4 in the finals.

2022
The league announced expansion into Cleburne, Texas, with a newly-formed four-team Texas Division with all games being played at The Depot at Cleburne Station, also the home of the Cleburne Railroaders of the professional American Association.  The four teams founded by the league included the Cleburne Eagles (named for the former Negro league team from the 1930's to 1960's), Joshua Trees, Burleson Boxers and Fort Worth Rodeo Cats.  However, the teams never played due to lack of interest.  Therefore, the Texas Division teams and plans were scrapped by the league.

The Oregon teams all returned for a third season and became known as the Portland Division with all games once again being played at Walker Stadium.  The Portland Gherkins won the 2022 WWWL Championship defeating the Gresham GreyWolves 9–7 in the championship game.

Special rules

PickleBot 3000
One of the main attractions to the league is an automated strike zone, dubbed Picklebot 3000.  Because of the Picklebot, only one field umpire is used for each game.  It was introduced in 2021 and has been used ever since.

Current teams

Former teams

Champions
 2020: West Linn Knights
 2021: Portland Rosebuds
 2022: Portland Gherkins

Broadcasting
The league broadcasts all games on Facebook Live and YouTube channels using the Portland Pickles' Broadcast Crew.  Carlo Jimenez was the initial play-by-play voice in 2020, followed by Mike Chexx in 2021.

References

External links 
 Wild West West League official website

Summer baseball leagues
Baseball in Oregon
Baseball in Texas
College baseball leagues in the United States
Sports leagues established in 2020
2020 establishments in Oregon
2021 establishments in Oregon
2022 establishments in Texas